Botnnuten is an isolated rock peak,  high, located south of Havsbotn and  southwest of Shirase Glacier in Queen Maud Land. It was mapped by Norwegian cartographers from air photos taken by the Lars Christensen Expedition, 1936–37, and named Botnnuten (the bottom peak), presumably in association with Havsbotn and because it is the farthest south peak in the immediate vicinity.

References 

Mountains of Queen Maud Land
Prince Harald Coast